Calke Abbey is a Grade I listed country house near Ticknall, Derbyshire, England, in the care of the charitable National Trust.

The site was an Augustinian priory from the 12th century until its dissolution by Henry VIII. The present building, named Calke Abbey in 1808, was never actually an abbey, but is a Baroque mansion built between 1701 and 1704.

The house was owned by the Harpur family for nearly 300 years until it was passed to the Trust in 1985 in lieu of death duties. Today, the house is open to the public and many of its rooms are deliberately displayed in the state of decline in which the house was handed to the Trust.

History

Calke Priory was founded by Richard d'Avranches, 2nd Earl of Chester some time between 1115 and 1120 and was dedicated to St Giles; d'Avranches had inherited from his father vast estates in both England and Normandy, of which Calke and many of the surrounding villages were part. The Priory was initially an independent community, but after the death of Ranulf de Gernon, 4th Earl of Chester in 1153, it (along with most of his Derbyshire estates) became part of the dowry of his widow, Maud of Gloucester. Maud initially granted nearby St. Wystan's Church, Repton to the canons at Calke Priory, but subsequently had a new priory, dedicated to the Holy Trinity, built at Repton. In 1172 she moved the Canons from Calke to the new Repton Priory, with Calke then becoming a subordinate "cell" to Repton Priory.

Nothing is known of the priory during the 14th and 15th centuries; however, historian Oliver Garnett suggests the priory may have served more as the centre of an agricultural estate than as a religious establishment during this time.

During the Dissolution of the Monasteries of 1536 – 1541, Repton, along with other monasteries whose income was £200 or less, failed to escape the first wave and was dissolved in 1536. A reinstatement was possible through the payment of a fine and on 12 June 1537, Repton was reinstated, at a cost of £266 13s 4d. A loan to cover this huge amount was made possible by John Preste (Prest and other variations), a Master Grocer of London, for which he received from Prior John Young a 99-year lease dated 31 August 1537 for Calke Priory with various lands and permissions, stating 59 years being prepaid to reflect the amount lent. This lease appeared to secure Calke’s future but on 25 October 1538 Repton Priory was surrendered for the second and final time, and the freehold of Calke transferred back to the Crown.

Post-Dissolution

When Repton was dissolved in 1538 John Preste relocated from London to Calke along with his family for safety. He remained until Thomas Cromwell was beheaded in 1540. During this time John converted Calke Priory into a Tudor house and his family remained at Calke Manor until his death in October 1546. In his will John left the remainder of the 99-year lease for Calke, which included the Tudor manor, to his youngest daughter Frances, aged about 8 years, with his wife Alice having custody and acting as guardian until Frances became of age or married. It stipulated that if Alice remained at Calke she was obliged to pay rent and cover the necessary repairs. A further condition stated that the lease was for Frances and her heirs only – meaning when she later married William Bradbourne in 1557, he was not allowed to take ownership of Calke, as was normal practice in Tudor times.

In January 1547 Alice married Richard Blackwell, lawyer of the Inner Temple, London and ignoring the fact that the legal owner of the lease was Frances, took everything of value as his ‘by rights of marriage to Alice'. He named himself as Calke’s owner in Queen Elizabeth’s Pardon Rolls in 1559 and in his will Richard referred to Calke Manor as the 'Chief Mansion House'. Meanwhile the freehold of Calke was granted by King Edward VI to John Dudley, Earl of Warwick (later Duke of Northumberland), for services in Scotland. Due to the 99-year lease already in place for Calke, nothing was to be gained from this freehold, so he sold it on to John Beaumont of Grace Dieu and his sons Francis and Henry Beaumont.

Following the death of Richard Blackwell in 1568 (Alice having died in 1561) his executors retained the lease, despite the fact that it had been awarded to Frances in her father's will. Her death in 1572, without any heirs, precipitated a court battle about the rightful ownership until 1573/4, when lawyer Richard Wendsley achieved a settlement to enjoy the lease under the title of John Smyth and Grace (nee Prest). In 1585 Wendsley defaulted on loans made by Robert Bainbridge, three-time MP for Derby, linked to the freehold and the leasehold of Calke, so Robert Bainbridge became the rightful legal owner of Calke. A final settlement was made to John Reames (Grace’s 2nd husband) and Grace to release their connection to Calke.

Robert Bainbridge was an avowed Protestant who was imprisoned in 1586 in the Beauchamp Tower of the Tower of London for refusing to accept Elizabeth I's Church Settlement, and may have chosen to live at Calke as the parish was not under the control of a bishop. He requested that his body be laid to rest in the vault he had built in St. Giles Church. Following Robert's death, Calke passed to his son Robert Bainbridge Jr, who sold the estate in 1622 to Sir Henry Harpur for £5,350.

The Tudor manor forms the core of the house that exists today, and parts are still visible within the house's courtyard. Little was known about how Calke Manor looked until repair work on the current house was undertaken by the National Trust in 1988. The house was built around a courtyard with the south range serving as the entrance front, with a gatehouse; two projections in the foundations at the northeast and northwest reveal the locations of 2 stair-turrets. The work also revealed a later 17th-century arcaded loggia which were built next to both the stair-turrets. The east and west ranges of this house were not parallel; something that has distinctly affected the shape and layout of the current house. This discrepancy could either reflect the different phases of construction within the Tudor house or the layout and alignment of the walls of the original priory buildings.

The Harpurs

In 1622 the estate was bought by Sir Henry Harpur, 1st baronet (c. 1579–1639). The Harpur family had become established in the middle of the previous century; descendants of Richard Harpur who was a successful lawyer who had risen to become a judge at the Court of Common Pleas at Westminster and then Chief Justice of the County Palatine of Lancaster. He and his descendants acquired, through wealth and marriage, estates in Staffordshire (centred on Alstonfield) and Derbyshire (centred on Swarkestone).

The house was rebuilt by Sir John Harpur, 4th baronet (1680–1741) between 1701 and 1704. The house and estate were owned by successive Harpur baronets and were ultimately inherited by Sir Vauncey Harpur Crewe (1846–1924), 10th (and last) baronet who was devoted to his collection of natural history specimens. When he died, his eldest daughter, Hilda Harpur Crewe (1877–1949) sold some of his collection of birds, butterflies and fishes to pay death duties. She was succeeded by her nephew, Charles Jenney (1917–81), who was the eldest son of Frances Harpur Crewe, the fourth daughter of Sir Vauncey.  Charles changed his name to Charles Harpur-Crewe.  His sudden death in 1981 led to crippling death duties (£8m of an estate worth £14m) and in 1985 the estate was transferred to the National Trust by his younger brother Henry Harpur-Crewe (1921–91).

National Trust ownership 

Set in the midst of a landscape park, Calke Abbey is presented by the National Trust as an illustration of the English country house in decline. At its time of endowment, there had been little change to many rooms since the 1880s. A massive amount of remedial work but no restoration has been done and interiors are almost as they were found in 1985, so the decay of the building and its interiors has been halted but not reversed.

Estate 
The Trust manages the surrounding landscape park with an eye to nature conservation. It contains such features as a walled garden, with a flower garden and a former physic garden, now managed as a kitchen garden. The ancient deer park of the Calke Abbey Estate is a designated Site of Special Scientific Interest and national nature reserve, particularly noted for its rare wood pasture habitat and associated deadwood invertebrate fauna. The estate is also listed at Grade II* on the National Register of Historic Parks and Gardens.

To the side of the house is a large quadrangle of buildings forming the old stable yard and farm, complete with old carriages and farm implements. The outbuildings incorporate a brewhouse that is linked to the main house by a tunnel.

The limestone quarries on the estate near Ticknall are the end point of the railway that took limestone to the Ashby Canal at Willesley basin and one of the tunnels can be seen restored and running under the drive. It closed in 1915.

See also
Grade I listed buildings in Derbyshire
Listed buildings in Calke

Gallery

References

Sources

External links

Calke Abbey information at National Trust

1704 establishments in England
Houses completed in 1704
Gardens in Derbyshire
Augustinian monasteries in England
Monasteries in Derbyshire
Country houses in Derbyshire
National Trust properties in Derbyshire
Grade I listed buildings in Derbyshire
Historic house museums in Derbyshire
Sites of Special Scientific Interest in Derbyshire
Grade I listed houses
Grade II* listed parks and gardens in Derbyshire
South Derbyshire District
Monasteries dissolved under the English Reformation